AUCP may refer to:

All-Union Communist Party (disambiguation)
American University in Cairo Press